Faridpur is an upazila of Pabna District in the Division of Rajshahi, Bangladesh.

Demographics
As of the 1991 Bangladesh census, Faridpur has a population of 111,464. Males constitute 51.44% of the population, and females 48.56%. This Upazila's eighteen up population is 52699. Faridpur has an average literacy rate of 26.3% (7+ years), and the national average of 32.4% literate.

Administration
Faridpur Upazila is divided into Faridpur Municipality and six union parishads: Banwarinagar, Brilahiribari, Demra, Faridpur, Hadal, and Pungali. The union parishads are subdivided into 56 mauzas and 87 villages.

Faridpur Municipality is subdivided into 9 wards and 16 mahallas.

See also
 Upazilas of Bangladesh
 Districts of Bangladesh
 Divisions of Bangladesh

References

Upazilas of Pabna District